Malcolm Edward Page (born 5 February 1947) is a Welsh former professional footballer born in Knucklas, Radnorshire (now Powys), who played as a defender or midfielder. He made 391 appearances and scored 10 goals for Birmingham City in all competitions over a 17-year career, and also played for Oxford United. He won 28 full caps for Wales, which at the time made him Birmingham City's most capped player, a record he held for 25 years until overtaken by Australia's Stan Lazaridis in 2005. He captained both club and country.

In 2012, Page was one of seven former players elected to Birmingham City's Hall of Fame.

References

Living people
1947 births
People from Radnorshire
Sportspeople from Powys
Welsh footballers
Wales international footballers
Wales under-23 international footballers
Association football defenders
Association football utility players
Birmingham City F.C. players
Oxford United F.C. players
English Football League players